Saba Kamali (born October 17, 1976) is an Iranian actress.

Career
She began her career with stage acting in 1997, and later made her film debut with 'Born in the Month of Mehr' (1999).

Kamali, however, found fame with the series After the Rain (2000).

She established herself as an actress with the period dramas 'The British Briefcase' (1999) and 'Shahriyar' (2006).

The Iranian actress has also appeared in 'The Black Eyes' (2002), 'Boutique' (2003), 'There's Always a Woman Involved' (2007) and 'The Redemption' (2010).

She won the Best Actress Award at the 3rd Tehran Theater Festival for her performance in the play 'From Nothingness to Humanity'.

Arrest
On 12 September 2019, an arrest warrant was issued for Kamali after her post on Instagram in support of Sahar Khodayari, who self-immolated after she was prosecuted for trying to enter the Azadi Stadium, an act which is considered illegal for Iranian females. In her post, she published an imaginary dialogue with Husayn ibn Ali questioning the relevance of ceremonial Ashura event.

Filmography
After the Rain (TV series)
Roozegar-e Gharib TV series
The English Briefcase (TV series)
Motevalled-e Mah-e Mehr
Cheshman-e Siah
Boutique
Hamisheh Pa-ye yek zan dar mian ast
The Redemption

References

External links

Living people
1976 births
People from Sari, Iran
People from Tehran
Iranian film actresses
Iranian stage actresses
Iranian television actresses